Colorado National Forest was established in Colorado on July 1, 1910, with  from Medicine Bow National Forest.  On March 28, 1932, it was renamed Roosevelt National Forest.

References

External links
Forest History Society
Forest History Society:Listing of the National Forests of the United States Text from Davis, Richard C., ed. Encyclopedia of American Forest and Conservation History. New York: Macmillan Publishing Company for the Forest History Society, 1983. Vol. II, pp. 743-788.

Former National Forests of Colorado